The Nokia 5250 is a budget Nokia resistive touchscreen smartphone running on Symbian v9.4 operating system with a S60 5th Edition user interface. Its price before tax and subsidies is €115. It was announced in August 2010. It was available in China, Eurasia, Europe, India, Latin America, Middle East, and South-East Asia and the Pacific Region. It is very small and compact. It comes preloaded with Guitar Hero Mobile series 5.

Reception
CNET Asia praised the resolution for the budget price, but criticized the lack of 3G capabilities, relying only on GSM and EDGE.

References

External links 
 Nokia 5250 Complete Device Specifications
 CNET

Mobile phones introduced in 2010
Nokia smartphones
Portable media players
Handwriting recognition
S60 (software platform)
Digital audio players
Personal digital assistants
Devices capable of speech recognition